The Nassau County Sports Commission is a non-profit, 501(c)(3) organization created to enhance the quality of life of Nassau County, New York, residents through the promotion of physical fitness, healthy activity and positive sportsmanship to combat childhood obesity and performance-enhancing drug use within their community. The foundation of the Nassau County Sports Commission is community-wide health education and sports recognition.

Programs

"Salute to Champions" Awards Dinner

The Nassau County Sports Commission is home to the Nassau County Sports Hall of Fame and the Dick Schaap Award for Outstanding Journalism.

Nassau County's elite high school and collegiate student athletes and coaches are honored annually at the Nassau County Sports Commission's "Salute to Champions" Awards Dinner where the above awards are also presented rounding into an all star recognition event for the community.

Fitness Trails

In Summer 2007, the Nassau County Sports Commission, working with Nassau County's "Healthy Nassau" initiative, installed a fitness trail in Eisenhower Park for use by Nassau County residents of all ages. These fitness stations will cover a two-mile walking path and promote physical activity while teaching residents how to maximize their physical fitness experience. In summer 2008, a new Nassau County Sports Commission fitness trail was installed in Wantagh Park. A third fitness trail in Nassau County can also be found in Christopher Morley Park.

Educational Pocket Guides

The Nassau County Sports Commission publishes and distributes educational pocket guides aimed at educating parents and youth on childhood obesity prevention, positive sportsmanship tips and the perils of performance-enhancing drugs.

Equipment Granting Program

The Nassau County Sports Commission has granted ice hockey, roller hockey, lacrosse and tennis equipment to the Nassau County, New York Department of Parks and Recreation and the Children's Sports Connection to be distributed and used by Nassau County youth that are in need.

Website

The Nassau County Sports Commission's official website has a local sports activities, organizations, and facilities database available for use by all community members.

Board of directors
Drug Expert Gary I. Wadler was the Chairman and President of the Nassau County Sports Commission.

External links
 http://www.nassausports.org
 

Nassau County, New York
Sports in Long Island
High school sports in New York (state)
Charities based in New York (state)
Sports charities